This is a comprehensive list of  rivers', organized primarily by continent and country.

General lists

 List of drainage basins by area (including rivers, lakes, and endorheic basins)
 List of largest unfragmented rivers
 List of longest undammed rivers
 List of river name etymologies
 List of rivers by age
 List of rivers by discharge
 List of rivers by length
 List of rivers of Central America and the Caribbean
 List of rivers of the Americas
 List of rivers of the Americas by coastline
 List of river films and television series

Rivers of Africa

Rivers of Eastern Africa 

 List of rivers of Eritrea
 List of rivers of Ethiopia
 List of rivers of Kenya
 List of rivers of Madagascar
 List of rivers of Mauritius
 List of rivers of Réunion
 List of rivers of Somalia
 List of rivers of South Sudan
 List of rivers of Uganda
 List of rivers of Zambia
 List of rivers of Zimbabwe

Rivers of Middle Africa 
 List of rivers of Chad

Rivers of Northern Africa 

 List of rivers of Egypt
 List of rivers of Morocco
 List of rivers of Sudan
 List of wadis of Libya

Rivers of Southern Africa 

 List of rivers of Lesotho
 List of rivers of South Africa

Rivers of Western Africa 

 List of rivers of Ghana
 List of rivers of Sierra Leone
 List of rivers of Togo

Rivers of Antarctica 
 List of rivers of Antarctica

Rivers of Asia

Rivers of Central Asia 

 List of rivers of Kazakhstan
 List of rivers of Kyrgyzstan
 List of rivers of Tajikistan
 List of rivers of Turkmenistan
 List of rivers of Uzbekistan
 List of rivers of India

Rivers of Eastern Asia 

 List of rivers of China
 List of rivers of Hong Kong
 List of rivers of Japan
 List of rivers of Korea
 List of rivers of North Korea
 List of rivers of South Korea
 List of rivers of Mongolia
 List of rivers of Taiwan

Rivers of Northern Asia 
 List of rivers of Russia

Rivers of South-eastern Asia 

 List of rivers of Brunei
 List of rivers of Cambodia
 List of rivers of East Timor
 List of rivers of Indonesia
 List of rivers of Laos
 List of rivers of Malaysia
 List of rivers of Myanmar
 List of rivers of the Philippines
 List of rivers of Singapore
 List of rivers of Thailand
 List of rivers of Vietnam

Rivers of Southern Asia 

 List of rivers of Afghanistan
 List of rivers of Bangladesh
 List of rivers of Bhutan
 List of rivers of India
 List of rivers in Kerala
 List of rivers in Tamil Nadu
 List of rivers of Assam
 List of rivers of Dakshina Kannada and Udupi districts
 List of rivers of Rajasthan
 List of rivers of West Bengal
 List of rivers of Iran
 List of rivers of Nepal
 List of rivers of Pakistan
 List of rivers of Sri Lanka

Rivers of Western Asia 

 List of rivers of Armenia
 List of rivers of Azerbaijan
 List of rivers of Cyprus
 List of rivers of Georgia
 List of rivers of Iraq
 List of rivers of Israel
 List of rivers of Jordan
 List of rivers of Lebanon
 List of rivers of Palestine
 List of rivers of Syria
 List of rivers of Turkey
 List of wadis of Kuwait
 List of wadis of Oman
 List of wadis of Qatar
 List of wadis of Saudi Arabia
 List of wadis of the United Arab Emirates
 List of wadis of Yemen

Rivers of Europe

General lists 

 List of European rivers with alternative names
 List of rivers discharging into the North Sea
 List of rivers of the Baltic Sea

Rivers of Eastern Europe 

 List of rivers of Belarus
 List of rivers of Bulgaria
 List of rivers of the Czech Republic
 List of rivers of Hungary
 List of rivers of Latvia
 List of rivers of Moldova
 List of rivers of Poland
 List of rivers of Romania
 List of longest rivers of Romania
 List of rivers of Russia
 List of rivers of Slovakia
 List of rivers of Ukraine

Rivers of Northern Europe 

 List of rivers of Denmark
 List of rivers of Estonia
 List of rivers of Finland
 List of rivers of Iceland
 List of rivers of Ireland
 List of rivers of the Isle of Man
 List of rivers of Lithuania
 List of rivers of Norway
 List of rivers of Sweden
 List of rivers of the United Kingdom
 List of rivers of England
 List of rivers of Northern Ireland
 List of rivers of Scotland
 List of rivers of Wales

Rivers of Southern Europe 

 List of rivers of Albania
 List of rivers of Bosnia and Herzegovina
 List of rivers of Croatia
 List of rivers of Greece
 List of rivers of Italy
 List of rivers of Montenegro
 List of rivers of North Macedonia
 List of rivers of Portugal
 List of rivers of Serbia
 List of rivers of Slovenia
 List of rivers of Spain
 List of rivers of Catalonia
 List of rivers of Galicia
 List of streams of Malta

Rivers of Western Europe 

 List of rivers of Austria
 List of rivers of Belgium
 List of rivers of France
 List of rivers of Germany
 List of rivers of Liechtenstein
 List of rivers of Luxembourg
 List of rivers of the Netherlands
 List of rivers of Switzerland

Rivers of North America

Rivers of the Caribbean 

 List of creeks of The Bahamas
 List of rivers of Antigua and Barbuda
 List of rivers of Barbados
 List of rivers of Cuba
 List of rivers of Dominica
 List of rivers of the Dominican Republic
 List of rivers of Ecuador
 List of rivers of Grenada
 List of rivers of Guadeloupe
 List of rivers of Haiti
 List of rivers of Jamaica
 List of rivers of Martinique
 List of rivers of Montserrat
 List of rivers of Puerto Rico
 List of rivers of Saint Kitts and Nevis
 List of rivers of Saint Lucia
 List of rivers of Saint Martin (France)
 List of rivers of Saint Pierre and Miquelon
 List of rivers of Saint Vincent and the Grenadines
 List of rivers of Trinidad and Tobago
 List of rivers of the United States Virgin Islands
 List of streams of the Dutch Caribbean
 List of streams of Aruba

Rivers of Central America 

 List of rivers of Belize
 List of rivers of Costa Rica
 List of rivers of El Salvador
 List of rivers of Guatemala
 List of rivers of Honduras
 List of rivers of Mexico
 List of rivers of Nicaragua
 List of rivers of Panama

Rivers of Northern America

Rivers of Canada 

 List of rivers of Alberta
 List of rivers of British Columbia
 List of rivers of Manitoba
 List of rivers of New Brunswick
 List of rivers of Newfoundland and Labrador
 List of rivers of the Northwest Territories
 List of rivers of Nova Scotia
 List of rivers of Nunavut
 List of rivers of Ontario
 List of rivers of Prince Edward Island
 List of rivers of Quebec
 List of rivers of Saskatchewan
 List of rivers of Yukon

Rivers of Greenland 
 List of rivers of Greenland

Rivers of the United States

General lists 

 List of longest rivers in the United States by state
 List of rivers of the Great Basin
 List of rivers of the Rocky Mountains
 List of U.S. rivers by discharge
 List of watercourses in the San Francisco Bay Area

Rivers of the United States by state 

 List of rivers of Alabama
 List of rivers of Alaska
 List of rivers of Arizona
 List of rivers of Arkansas
 List of rivers of California
 List of rivers of Colorado
 List of rivers of Connecticut
 List of rivers of Delaware
 List of rivers of Florida
 List of rivers of Georgia
 List of rivers of Hawaii
 List of rivers of Idaho
 List of rivers of Illinois
 List of rivers of Indiana
 List of rivers of Iowa
 List of rivers of Kansas
 List of rivers of Kentucky
 List of rivers of Louisiana
 List of rivers of Maine
 List of rivers of Maryland
 List of rivers of Massachusetts
 List of rivers of Michigan
 List of rivers of Minnesota
 List of rivers of Mississippi
 List of rivers of Missouri
 List of rivers of Montana
 List of rivers of Nebraska
 List of rivers of Nevada
 List of rivers of New Hampshire
 List of rivers of New Jersey
 List of rivers of New Mexico
 List of rivers of New York
 List of rivers of North Carolina
 List of rivers of North Dakota
 List of rivers of Ohio
 List of rivers of Oklahoma
 List of rivers of Oregon
 List of rivers of Pennsylvania
 List of rivers of Rhode Island
 List of rivers of South Carolina
 List of rivers of South Dakota
 List of rivers of Tennessee
 List of rivers of Texas
 List of rivers of Utah
 List of rivers of Vermont
 List of rivers of Virginia
 List of rivers of Washington
 List of rivers of Washington, D.C.
 List of rivers of West Virginia
 List of rivers of Wisconsin
 List of rivers of Wyoming

Rivers of Oceania 

 List of rivers of Australia
 List of rivers of New South Wales (A–K)
 List of rivers of New South Wales (L–Z)
 List of rivers of Tasmania
 List of rivers of Guam
 List of rivers of Hawaii
 List of rivers of the Federated States of Micronesia
 List of rivers of New Zealand
 List of rivers of the Marlborough Region
 List of rivers of New Zealand by length

Rivers of South America 

 List of rivers of Argentina
 List of rivers of Mendoza Province
 List of rivers of Bolivia
 List of rivers of Brazil
 List of rivers of Chile
 List of rivers of Colombia
 List of rivers of Ecuador
 List of rivers of the Falkland Islands
 List of rivers of French Guiana
 List of rivers of Guyana
 List of rivers of Paraguay
 List of rivers of Peru
 List of rivers of Suriname
 List of rivers of Uruguay
 List of rivers of Venezuela

Extraterrestrial Rivers 
 List of rivers on Titan

 
Geography-related lists
Lists of bodies of water